Ljutovnica is a village in the municipality of Gornji Milanovac, Serbia. According to the 2002 census, the village had a population of 190 people.

References

Populated places in Moravica District